Lisa Beres is a Healthy Home Authority, certified green building professional, Building Biologist (BBEC) and children's book author. Beres wrote My Body My House, a parable of the dangers of introducing hazardous chemicals into one's home. She is also the co-author with Sally Jessy Raphael of the audio CD: Your Home Through Green Colored Glasses. In addition she has co-authored several audio CDs including Learn to Create a Healthy Home, an educational tool used for identifying unhealthy products in the home and The 9 to 5 Greened: 10 Steps to a Healthy Office. Lisa is also the co-author of the newly released book, Just Green It! Simple Swaps to Save the Planet and Your Health (Running Press; April 2010).

Beres and her husband, Ron Beres, are often relied upon as subject matter experts for issues related to green and healthy living. The Beres' are Telly Award Winning experts and have provided expert commentary on several radio and television shows including NBC's Today Show, Discovery Channel's “Greenovate,” Fox & Friends, Living Well with Montel Williams, The Doctors, Dr. Oz, Home Shopping Network, NBC's Nightly New, The Suzanne Somers Show, and Chelsea Lately on E! Lisa is a national spokesperson for organic, green, non-toxic products and conducts Healthy Home Media Tours across the country.

Beres has served as an advisory board member for Cal State Fullerton University's UEE Green Building Program and on the board of directors for the Institute for Building Biology and Ecology. She and her husband Ron Beres founded of Green Nest, a retailer of environmentally safe products which they sold in 2011. They are the founders of RonandLisa.com, where they offer online programs (Change Your Home. Change Your Health in 30 Days) and solutions to teach people how to eliminate toxins from their life with simple steps to improve their health. A frequent contributor to several radio and television news programs, Beres acts as green correspondent for the Sally Jessy Raphael radio show and podcast. Beres lives in Irvine, California. Beres and her husband, Ron Beres, conduct professional speaking engagements across the country educating consumers on how to create healthier homes and greener lives. Recently, they educated southern Californians on "How to Live a Green Life" at Maria Shriver's Women's Conference. On October 21, 2008, they joined A-Listers including: Warren Buffett Arnold Schwarzenegger, Jennifer Lopez, Bono, and others. The entire list of speakers can be viewed at Women's Conference 2008. Lisa Beres is owner and co-founder of RonandLisa.com, an online publishing platform offering education to create toxic free home environments. Their consulting business includes celebrities as well as Fortune 1000 companies.

Published works

References

External links
 - Official Healthy Home Dream Team website
Build It Green - A non-profit membership organization whose mission is to promote health, energy- and resource-efficient building practices in California
International Institute for Bau-Biologie and Ecology
Just Green It - Official book website
 - Official blog
Facebook.com/RonandLisaTheHealthyHomeDreamTeam - Facebook Business Page
Twitter.com/ronandlisa - Twitter Page
YouTube.com/HealthyHomeDreamTeam - YouTube channel
https://www.instagram.com/ronandlisa/ - Instagram page

American children's writers
Living people
Year of birth missing (living people)